Jeunesse Sportive de Bordj Ménaïel,, known as JS Bordj Ménaïel or simply JSBM  for short, is an Algerian football club based in the city of Bordj Ménaïel, Algeria. The club was founded in 1932 and its colours are red and black. Their home stadium, Salah Takdjerad Stadium, has a capacity of 7,000 spectators. The club is currently playing in the Algerian Ligue 2.

History
The club spent 13 seasons playing in the Algerian top flight, with their last season being in 1995–96. The club's best finish was in the 1993–1994 season when they finished second to champions US Chaouia, who had the same number of points but a better goal differential.

In 1987, the club reached the final of the Algerian Cup where they lost to eventual champions USM El Harrach 1–0.

In 1995, the club played in the CAF Cup. In the first round, they beat Burkinabé side Union Sportive des Forces Armées 6–3 on aggregate, after winning the home leg 5–1 and losing the return leg 2–1. In the second round, they lost 3–3 on the away goals rule to Tunisian club Etoile du Sahel, after beating them 3–1 at home and losing 2–0 on the road.

On June 25, 2022, JS Bordj Ménaïel promoted to the Algerian Ligue 2.

Achievements
Algerian Championnat National
Runner-up (1): 1993–94

Algerian Cup
Runner-up (1): 1986–87

Performance in CAF competitions
CAF Cup: 1 appearance
1995 – Second Round

Former players
A number of the club's former players have gone on to play for neighboring JS Kabylie and achieve international success. The most recent player to make the switch is Algerian international Fawzi Chaouchi who played at the 2010 FIFA World Cup.

  Farouk Belkaïd
  Abdelhak Benchikha
  Lounés Bendahmane
  Bachir Boudjelid
  Fawzi Chaouchi
  Karim Doudène
  Noureddine Drioueche
  Saïd Hamrani
  Lounes Laouzai
  Salah Mohamed Samadi

Coaches

See also
League Boumerdès Football Association

References

External links

Football clubs in Algeria
Association football clubs established in 1932
1932 establishments in Algeria
Sports clubs in Algeria